Paulton Halt railway station was on the Camerton branch of the Great Western Railway in Somerset, England. It was in use from 1914 until 1925, however it was closed for 8½ of these 12 years due to World War I.

History

There was no station between Hallatrow and Camerton until  was opened at the same time as the line was opened through to Limpley Stoke, and on 5 January 1914 Paulton Halt itself was opened. The term 'halt' was used by the GWR to denote railway stations without staff or goods facilities.

Passenger services had only been calling for a little over a year when, on 22 March 1915, they were withdrawn from the line due to the war. They were eventually restored on 9 July 1923, four and a half years after hostilities had ceased. They did not last long as they were withdrawn again on 21 September 1925, never to be resumed. Freight trains continued to operate through the station until 8 February 1932 and the track was lifted shortly afterwards.

Description
The stone-built  platform was situated on the north side of the line,  from Hallatrow at a place known as Gossard's Bridge; the Cam Brook was on the south side of the line opposite the platform. Three oil lamps were provided and a plan suggests that a shelter was intended, but no photographic evidence of it exists. Access was by a footpath from the Paulton to High Littleton road that crossed the line at the east end of the station on a bridge.

In 2010 a portion of the platform edge still stood, as did the access path and some railway fencing.

Services
Passenger trains on the Hallatrow to Limpley Stoke line were operated by steam railmotors or, later, by auto trains. In 1914 there were five trains each day, Monday to Saturday only. In 1923 this had been reduced to just four.

References

Railway stations in Great Britain opened in 1914
Railway stations in Great Britain closed in 1915
Railway stations in Great Britain opened in 1923
Railway stations in Great Britain closed in 1925
Former Great Western Railway stations
Disused railway stations in Somerset
Transport in Bath and North East Somerset